Haplopediasia is a genus of moths of the family Crambidae. It contains only one species, Haplopediasia aurantilineellus, which is found in Brazil (São Paulo).

References

Crambini
Monotypic moth genera
Moths of South America
Crambidae genera
Taxa named by Stanisław Błeszyński